Night Flight or Nightflight may refer to:

 a flight during the night, see red-eye flight

Music 

 Night Flight (Justin Hayward album), 1980
 Night Flight (Gil Fuller album), 1965
 Night Flight, Op. 19, a 1964 tone poem by Samuel Barber
 Nightflight (Gábor Szabó album), 1976
 Nightflight (Budgie album), 1981
 Nightflight (Kate Miller-Heidke album), 2012
 "Night Flight" (song), a 1975 Led Zeppelin song

Other 

 Night Flight (novel), a 1931 novel by Antoine de Saint Exupéry
 Night Flight (1933 film), starring Clark Gable, based on the novel
 Night Flight (2014 film), a South Korean film 
 Night Flight (TV series), a television program on the USA Network, first airing in 1981
 Night Flight (night club), a Moscow strip club
 Nightflight (Transformers), a member of the Micromasters
 Night Flight (radio broadcasting), a former radio broadcasting series on BFBS Germany by Alan Bangs from 1975 to 1989
 Nachtflug (radio broadcasting), a former German radio broadcasting series on 1Live by Alan Bangs in 1995
 Nightflight (radio broadcasting), a former German radio broadcasting series on DRadio Wissen by Alan Bangs from 2010 to 2013

See also 
 Volo di notte (Night Flight), an opera adaptation of Saint Exupéry's book by Luigi Dallapiccola
 "Nite Flights" (song), a 1978 song by The Walker Brothers